is a Japanese volleyball player. He competed in the men's tournament at the 1976 Summer Olympics. He announced retirement in 1991.

References

External links
 

1951 births
Living people
Japanese men's volleyball players
Olympic volleyball players of Japan
Volleyball players at the 1976 Summer Olympics
Sportspeople from Osaka Prefecture
Asian Games medalists in volleyball
Asian Games gold medalists for Japan
Volleyball players at the 1974 Asian Games
Medalists at the 1974 Asian Games